Virgin Atlantic, a trading name of Virgin Atlantic Airways Limited and Virgin Atlantic International Limited, is a British airline with its head office in Crawley, England. The airline was established in 1984 as British Atlantic Airways, and was originally planned by its co-founders Randolph Fields and Alan Hellary to fly between London and the Falkland Islands. Soon after changing the name to Virgin Atlantic Airways, Fields sold his shares in the company after disagreements with Richard Branson over the management of the company. The maiden flight from Gatwick Airport to Newark International Airport took place on 22 June 1984.

The airline along with Virgin Holidays is controlled by a holding company, Virgin Atlantic Limited, which is 51% owned by the Virgin Group and 49% by Delta Air Lines. It is administratively separate from other Virgin-branded airlines. Virgin Atlantic Airways Limited and Virgin Atlantic International Limited both hold Civil Aviation Authority (CAA) Type A Operating Licences (AOC numbers 534 and 2435 respectively), both of which permit these airlines, operating as Virgin Atlantic Airways, to carry passengers, cargo and mail on aircraft with 20 or more seats.

Virgin Atlantic uses a mixed fleet of Airbus and Boeing wide-body aircraft and operates to destinations in North America, the Caribbean, Africa, the Middle East and Asia from its main hub at London–Heathrow, and its secondary hub at Manchester. The airline also operates a seasonal service from Edinburgh. Virgin Atlantic aircraft consist of three cabins: Economy, Premium (formerly Premium economy) and Upper Class (business).

In July 2017, Virgin Atlantic announced its intention to form a joint venture with Air France–KLM, but in December 2019, it was announced that the joint venture would not include a stake in the company.

On 5 May 2020, it was announced that due to the COVID-19 pandemic, the airline would lay off 3,000 staff, reduce the fleet size to 35 by the summer of 2022, retire the Boeing 747-400s and would not resume operations from Gatwick following the pandemic.

Virgin Atlantic filed for Chapter 15 Bankruptcy Protection in New York on 4 August 2020 as part of a £1.2 billion private refinancing package. The airline joined the SkyTeam airline alliance on 2 March 2023.

History

Origins

Virgin Atlantic has its origins in a joint endeavour by Randolph Fields, an American-born lawyer, and Alan Hellary, a former chief pilot for British private airline Laker Airways. Following the collapse of Laker Airways in 1982, Fields and Hellary decided to establish a new company, initially named British Atlantic Airways, as a successor. Reportedly, Fields had formed a concept for an airline that would operate between London and the Falkland Islands during June 1982, when the Falklands War had just finished. Seeking out expertise in the field, Fields made contact with Hellary, who had already been considering options for establishing a regular commercial service to the Falklands. In turn, Hellary was in contact with several out-of-work colleagues from the collapse of Laker Airways; as such, the pair decided to refine their ambitions.

However, it was soon determined that the short runway at Port Stanley Airport, and the time it would take to improve it, would render a route to the Falklands commercially unviable, thus the idea of such a service was dropped. In its place, Hellary and Fields commenced efforts to secure a licence to operate a route between Gatwick Airport, London and John F. Kennedy International Airport, New York City. During May 1983, a three-day inquiry was conducted, which chose to reject the application following objections from British Airways, British Caledonian and BAA.

Hellary and Fields then applied for a licence between Gatwick and Newark, New Jersey, using a 380-seat McDonnell Douglas DC-10. However, faced with the prospect of direct competition from rival operator PEOPLExpress, a post-deregulation "no frills" discount airline based at Newark, they decided to secure more funding before proceeding. Fields met British entrepreneur Richard Branson at a party in London during which he proposed a business partnership. After protracted and testy negotiations, Fields agreed to a reduced stake of 25% in the airline (which was renamed Virgin Atlantic) and became its first chairman. Following disagreements over operations, Fields agreed to be bought out for an initial sum of £1 million with further payment on Virgin Atlantic's first dividend. As a result of a High Court action, this additional payment was received shortly before Fields' death in 1997.

Formative years

On 22 June 1984, Virgin Atlantic operated its inaugural scheduled service, flown between Gatwick and Newark using a leased Boeing 747-200 (registration ), christened Maiden Voyager, which had been formerly operated by Aerolíneas Argentinas. From the onset, its activities were augmented by leveraging existing Virgin Group resources, such as tickets being sold at Virgin Megastores record shops.

Part of Richard Branson's declared approach to business is to either succeed within the first year or exit the market; this ethos includes a one-year limit being expressed upon everything associated with starting up operations. Virgin Atlantic became profitable within the first 12 months, aided by sister company Virgin Records' ability to finance the lease of a secondhand Boeing 747. The firm had timed its operations to take advantage of a full summer, from June to September, which was typically the most profitable period of the year.

In November 1984 the airline launched a service between Gatwick Airport and Maastricht Aachen Airport in the Netherlands using a chartered BAC One-Eleven.

In 1986 the airline added another Boeing 747 to its fleet and started a scheduled route from Gatwick to Miami. Additional aircraft were quickly acquired and new routes launched from Gatwick, such as to New York JFK in 1988, Tokyo Narita in 1989, Los Angeles in 1990, Boston in 1991, and Orlando in 1992. In 1987, Virgin Atlantic launched a service between Luton and Dublin using secondhand Vickers Viscount turboprop aircraft, but this route was withdrawn around 1990. The airline also operated a Viscount service between Maastricht and London Luton Airport in 1989. During 1988, Club Air operated two Boeing 727 jet aircraft on behalf of Virgin Atlantic; these served the Luton to Dublin route until about 1990.

Competition

In 1991, Virgin Atlantic was given permission to operate from Heathrow following the abolition of the London Air Traffic Distribution Rules (TDRs), which had governed the distribution of traffic between Heathrow and Gatwick airports since 1978, primarily to bolster the profitability of Gatwick. Airlines without an international scheduled service from Heathrow prior to 1 April 1977 were obliged to operate from Gatwick. However, airlines that did not already operate at Heathrow were still able to begin domestic scheduled services there provided BAA, which then ran both Heathrow and Gatwick on behalf of the UK government, and the Secretary of State for Transport, granted permission.

The Civil Aviation Authority also transferred two pairs of unused landing slots that British Airways held at Tokyo's Narita Airport to Virgin Atlantic; allowing it to increase frequency between Heathrow and Tokyo from four to six weekly round trips, making it easier to compete against British Airways. The then-chairman of BA Lord King called the CAA's decision, which the government had endorsed, "a confiscation of his company's property".

In the year to October 1993, Virgin Atlantic declared a loss of £9.3m. The decision to abolish the London TDRs and to let Virgin Atlantic operate at Heathrow, in competition with British Airways, became the trigger for BA's so-called "dirty tricks" campaign against the company. During 1993, BA's public relations director, David Burnside, published an article in BA News, British Airways' internal magazine, which argued that Branson's protests against British Airways were a publicity stunt. Branson sued British Airways for libel, using the services of George Carman QC. BA settled out of court when its lawyers discovered the lengths to which the company had gone in trying to kill off Virgin Atlantic. British Airways had to pay a legal bill of up to £3 million, damages to Branson of £500,000, and a further £110,000 to his airline. Branson reportedly donated the proceeds from the case to Virgin Atlantic staff.

During the 1990s, Virgin Atlantic jets were painted with "No Way BA/AA" as a declaration of its opposition to the attempted merger between British Airways and American Airlines. In 1997, following British Airways' announcement that it was to remove the Union Flag from its tailfins in favour of world images, Virgin Atlantic introduced a Union Flag design on the winglets of its aircraft and changed the red dress on the Scarlet Lady on the nose of aircraft to the union flag with the tag line "Britain's Flag Carrier". This was a tongue-in-cheek challenge to BA's traditional role as the UK's flag carrier.

In June 2006, US and UK competition authorities investigated alleged price fixing between Virgin Atlantic and British Airways over passenger fuel surcharges. In August 2007, BA was fined £271 million by the UK Office of Fair Trading (OFT) and the US Department of Justice. However, the Chief Executive of Virgin Atlantic, Steve Ridgway, was forced to admit that the company had been a party to the agreement, had been aware of the price-fixing and had taken no steps whatsoever to stop the price-fixing. The company escaped a similar fine to that levied on British Airways only by virtue of the immunity it had earlier negotiated with the regulators.

In April 2010, a tip-off from Cathay Pacific led to an Office of Fair Trading (OFT) investigation of alleged price-fixing between Virgin Atlantic and Cathay Pacific on flights to Hong Kong between 2002 and 2006. Cathay Pacific received immunity from prosecution for reporting the alleged offence. A maximum fine, if found guilty, was 10% of turnover, which, based on the £2.5 billion in sales for the year to February 2009, would have been £250 million. At the time, the OFT stressed that it should not be assumed that the parties involved had broken the law. The OFT cleared both airlines in December 2012, concluding there were "no grounds for action".

Recent years

In May 2014 Virgin Atlantic ended flights to Sydney. In September 2014 Virgin Atlantic announced plans to scrap flights to Tokyo, Mumbai, Vancouver, and Cape Town, and to codeshare transatlantic flights with Delta Air Lines; the company was also reported to be considering axing its new Little Red domestic airline after suffering heavy losses.

On 6 October 2014, Virgin Atlantic confirmed that Little Red services between London and Manchester would end in March 2015, and that the Scottish routes would be terminated in September 2015. Passengers used the routes from point to point as opposed to using it as a connection for longer haul Virgin Atlantic flights. The former BMI routes continued with rival airline British Airways.

In June 2015, Richard Branson stated that Virgin Atlantic had needed the aforementioned deal with Delta to survive, after losses of £233 million between 2010 and 2013.  In the same month, the airline announced it would cut 500 jobs to establish a more efficient management structure.

In July 2017, Air France-KLM nearly acquired a 31% stake in Virgin Atlantic for £220 million. This deal however never went through.

In 2019, Virgin Atlantic began to allow its female flight attendants to not wear makeup and have a choice to wear trousers rather than a skirt. In September 2019, it was announced Virgin Atlantic had outlined plans to expand. A key part of these plans would have been acquiring Flybe, with a plan to rebrand it as "Virgin Connect" from early 2020; however, the plans fell through when Flybe filed for administration and ceased operations in March 2020.  In December 2019, Branson announced that he would be scrapping the sale of a 31% stake in the airline to Air France-KLM and that Virgin Group would retain its 51% shareholding.

In March 2020, during the COVID-19 pandemic, Richard Branson and Virgin Atlantic attracted criticism by asking employees to take eight weeks' unpaid leave. However, this was before the UK Government announced the Coronavirus Job Retention Scheme, and employees were subsequently furloughed instead. Whilst furloughed, many staff volunteered with the NHS, answering 999 calls, and at NHS Trusts in London and the South East. On 27 March, it was reported that Virgin Atlantic was expected to seek a government bailout, which was on 1 April reportedly backed by Rolls-Royce, Airbus and Heathrow.

In May 2020, Virgin Atlantic announced over 3,000 jobs losses in the UK and an imminent end to operations at Gatwick Airport. On June 7, Virgin Atlantic commenced cargo-only flights between Brussels Airport and London Heathrow, feeding the high demand for European cargo into its network via LHR. As of 2022 the flights still continue on a daily basis, using all aircraft types within the fleet. On 4 August, Virgin Atlantic filed for bankruptcy protection from creditors in the US as part of a recapitalisation and debt restructuring plan. On August 25, 2020, creditors approved the £1.2bn (€1.3bn) rescue package and debt restructuring.  On September 4, 2020, Virgin Atlantic announced a second round of job cuts, totalling 1,150 across all departments. Since the start of 2020, the company halved its workforce due to the COVID-19 pandemic. Chief executive Shai Weiss said that "further reducing the number of people we employ is heartbreaking but essential." 

As of February 2022, during Russia's invasion of Ukraine, Virgin Atlantic, along with the other UK carriers, observed a ban from travelling in Russian airspace that was a retaliatory measure for the UK's ban on Russia's main carrier, Aeroflot and all other Russian private jets and carriers from using UK airspace. Virgin Atlantic said that avoiding Russia would add between 15 minutes and an hour to flight journeys between the UK and India and Pakistan.

On 27 September 2022, Virgin Atlantic announced that the airline will join SkyTeam airline alliance in 2023. According to SkyTeam CEO Kristin Colville and Virgin Atlantic CEO Shai Weiss, the airline's membership will commence at the beginning of the year. It will be the first time that a British airline will join an Airline Alliance since British Midland International joined Star Alliance in 2002 and British Airways of OneWorld in 1999. In February 2023, the airline stated that it will officially be a part of the SkyTeam airline alliance on March 2, 2023.

Corporate affairs

Offices

Virgin Atlantic's head office, known as The VHQ, is located on a business park in Crawley, England, near Gatwick Airport and also houses the corporate offices of Virgin Holidays. The company operates several offices and call centres around the United Kingdom, including a large office in Swansea, Wales, which is a base for reservations, sales, baggage claims and tracing, 'live chat' web support and a customer relations department.

International offices are located at Atlanta, Barbados, Greater Delhi, Hong Kong, Johannesburg, Lagos and Shanghai.

Ownership
Virgin Group sold a 49% stake in the airline to Singapore Airlines in 1999 for £600 million. On 14 May 2008, Singapore Airlines formally announced an invitation for offers for its Virgin Atlantic stake, and publicly acknowledged that its stake in the airline had "underperformed".

In November 2010, it was reported that Virgin Atlantic had appointed Deutsche Bank to begin a strategic review of options for the airline following the tie-up between British Airways and American Airlines. By February 2011, it was confirmed that SkyTeam members Air France–KLM and Delta Air Lines had appointed Goldman Sachs to advise them on a joint potential approach for Virgin Atlantic. Etihad Airways was also reported to be considering a deal, and Willie Walsh, chief executive of International Airlines Group, stated that they would be interested in the airline, but only for the lucrative take-off and landing slots it holds at Heathrow Airport.

On 11 December 2012, Delta Air Lines confirmed the purchase of Singapore Airlines' 49% stake in Virgin Atlantic for £224 million, with plans to develop a transatlantic joint venture. Regulatory approval from the United States and European Union was granted on 20 June 2013, and the purchase was completed on 24 June. In December 2012, International Airlines Group CEO, Willie Walsh, suggested that the loss-making company would be history within five years. "I can't see Delta wanting to operate the Virgin brand because if they do what does that say about the Delta brand? I just don't see that the guy [Branson] has anything that stands out in terms of what he has achieved in the industry."

In July 2017, Virgin Group agreed to sell a 31% stake in the airline to Air France-KLM for £220 million, leaving it with a 20% holding. The deal fell through in late 2019.

Senior leadership 

 Chairman: Peter Norris (since July 2012)
 Chief Executive: Shai Weiss (since January 2019)

List of former chairmen 
 Randolph Fields (1984–1985)
 Sir Richard Branson (1985–2012)

List of former chief executives 

 Sir Richard Branson (1984–2001)
Steve Ridgway (2001–2013)
 Craig Kreeger (2013–2018)

Business trends
The key trends for Virgin Atlantic are shown below (from 2014 onwards, figures are for year ending December; earlier figures are for year ending February, and exclude Virgin Nigeria operations 2005–2008):

Service concept

Virgin Atlantic aircraft operate with a three-class cabin configuration: Economy, Premium (formerly Premium Economy), and Upper Class - the business class product. Premium has a separate check-in area, priority boarding and a wider seat with more legroom. Upper Class features a seat that converts into a fully flat bed and access to chauffeur drive (in a private check in area called the Upper Class Wing at London Heathrow). Virgin Atlantic was the first airline to offer personal entertainment for all passengers in all classes.

The airline's frequent-flyer program is styled 'the Flying Club'.

Virgin Atlantic operates 6 lounges worldwide called 'Clubhouse' at London Heathrow, New York-JFK, Boston, Washington D.C.-Dulles, San Francisco and Johannesburg. It also operates a 'Revivals' arrival lounge in London Heathrow. They are accessible for passengers travelling in Upper Class and Flying Club Gold tier members. Where applicable, Upper Class passengers are also welcome to use Delta Sky Clubs prior to departure.

Little Red

British Midland International provided domestic and European feeder traffic into Heathrow Airport in partnership with Virgin until it was purchased by British Airways' parent company International Airlines Group in 2011. The Lufthansa-owned airline had faced heavy annual losses of more than £100 million. Under the terms of the takeover, IAG had to relinquish some former BMI domestic slots at Heathrow. Virgin Atlantic purchased enough slots in 2012 to enable it to launch a domestic service on 31 March 2013, under the Little Red brand, operating a total of 12 daily services from London to Aberdeen (three), Edinburgh (six), and Manchester (three). The airline wet-leased four Airbus Airbus A320-200s from Aer Lingus, operating with Virgin Atlantic livery, under a three-year contract.

In September 2014, it was reported that Virgin Atlantic was considering closing its domestic brand after suffering heavy losses, with Civil Aviation Authority figures confirming an average seat occupancy level of just 37.6% in 2013. The 12 daily pairs of take-off and landing slots at Heathrow cannot be sold to be used for long-haul routes.

On 6 October 2014, Virgin Atlantic confirmed that the Little Red service would cease; flights to Manchester ended on 28 March 2015 and flights to Edinburgh and Aberdeen ended on 26 September 2015.

Virgin Atlantic International Limited
On 13 April 2015, Virgin Atlantic incorporated a new subsidiary – Virgin Atlantic International Limited (VAIL). In November 2015, VAIL obtained its own Air Operators Certificate and Operating Licence, and commenced operations with two former Virgin Atlantic Airways Limited operated Airbus A330-300 aircraft taking over routes previously operated by Virgin Atlantic Limited between London Gatwick and Barbados, St Lucia, Antigua, Grenada and Tobago. These flights are operated on behalf of Virgin Atlantic.

Upon incorporation as an AOC holder, the majority of Virgin Atlantic's landing slots at London Heathrow Airport were transferred to VAIL, allowing Virgin Atlantic to access the value of the carriers' slots by 'mortgaging' them through open investment from capital markets.

Flybe takeover bid
On 11 January 2019, Virgin Atlantic formed the Connect Airways consortium with Stobart Aviation and Cyrus Capital, to make a takeover bid for Flybe. The deal would see the consortium combine Flybe and Stobart Air with Virgin Atlantic to create an integrated carrier operating under the Virgin Atlantic brand. Flybe and Stobart Air would however retain their own Air Operator Certificates. On 15 January 2019, Connect Airways announced an increased offer, which Flybe's board accepted. On 21 February 2019, the Flybe Group confirmed that its operating assets, including the airline and the website, had indeed been transferred to Connect Airways, despite a last-minute rival bid. However, despite the investment of £135 million from Connect Airways into Flybe, the airline filed for administration and ceased operations with immediate effect in March 2020, following reduced demand that Virgin Atlantic attributed to the COVID-19 pandemic and the UK government failing to grant a £100 million loan.

Gender-neutral ticketing and uniforms

In September 2022, Virgin Atlantic announced the introduction of two new sets of uniforms, designed by Vivienne Westwood, as well as a new policy to embrace the concept of gender neutrality. One uniform comprises a bright red skirt suit and high-heeled shoes, and the other a burgundy-coloured trouser suit with a grey waistcoat, red tie and flat black shoes. Staff will be allowed to choose either uniform, and may also choose to wear a badge indicating their preferred pronoun of address. The new uniforms are for crew, pilots and ground staff.

At the same time, the company is making changes to its ticketing systems to allow those holding passports which indicate gender-neutrality to be entered as “U” or “X”, as well as offering a new title of address, “Mx”, on their reservations. At this time, not all countries offer this option on passports; those that do include the United States, India, Pakistan, Nepal, Australia, Canada, Argentina, Colombia, Germany, Ireland, and Iceland.

Destinations

Codeshare agreements
Virgin Atlantic has codeshare agreements with the following airlines:

 Aeroméxico
 Air France (Joint Venture Partner)
 Air New Zealand
 Delta Air Lines (Joint Venture Partner)
 IndiGo
 KLM (Joint Venture Partner)
 LATAM Airlines Group
 Middle East Airlines
 Singapore Airlines
 Virgin Australia
 WestJet

Interline agreements
Virgin Atlantic has interline agreements with the following airlines:

 Aegean Airlines
 Aer Lingus
 Air India
 Airlink
 Air Malta
 Air Serbia
 Bulgaria Air
 British Airways
 Caribbean Airlines
 Hawaiian Airlines
 Hong Kong Airlines
 Icelandair
 ITA Airways
 Kenya Airways
 Scandinavian Airlines
 TAP Air Portugal
 TAROM
 Turkish Airlines
 Vistara

Fleet

Virgin Atlantic operates a fleet consisting entirely of widebody aircraft from both Airbus and Boeing.

Livery

Virgin Atlantic's first aircraft were painted with a "Eurowhite" design with a red stripe through the centre of the main deck windows. The engines were metallic silver and the tail red with the logo in white. In the 1990s, the refreshed design was introduced, removing the centre red stripe through the windows, engines were painted red, the Virgin Atlantic titles in grey were added along the main fuselage, and the 'Flying Lady' was introduced to the nose area.

In October 2006, with the delivery of G-VRED, Virgin Atlantic introduced a new design, with the fuselage painted in metallic silver and a revised tail fin, with red and purple features and the logo. Near the nose of each aircraft is a pin-up girl, the "Scarlet Lady", carrying a Union flag, which was designed by British artist Ken White, who modelled the motif on the World War II pin-ups of Alberto Vargas – hence the naming one of the fleet Varga Girl (in this case, an A340-600 registered G-VGAS).

Each aircraft has a name, usually feminine, such as Ladybird, Island Lady, and Ruby Tuesday, but some are linked to registrations (e.g. G-VFIZ became Bubbles). A couple are commemorative names (e.g. G-VEIL—Queen of the Skies—which was named by Queen Elizabeth II on 7 April 2004, marking the centenary of the Entente Cordiale; this frame exited the fleet in April 2016). An exception is Spirit of Sir Freddie. An early Boeing 747, it was named in honour of Freddie Laker of Laker Airways, who helped Virgin Atlantic following the demise of his own airline. G-VFAB—Lady Penelope—gained a special livery to celebrate Virgin Atlantic's 21st birthday. G-VFAB, Lady Penelope, exited the fleet in September 2015 after 21 years of service and was subsequently parted out. In 2006, the airline ran an eBay auction to name an Airbus A340-600, registered G-VYOU. The winner named it Emmeline Heaney after his newborn daughter, and the name adorned the aircraft for the remainder of its operating service until the aircraft was retired in October 2019. In 2018, a previously stored Airbus A340-600 registered G-VNAP was returned to active use by Virgin Atlantic, and was renamed from Sleeping Beauty to Sleeping Beauty Rejuvenated. It additionally received a special "thank you" livery dedicated to its 9,000 employees. In 2019, one of the airline's Boeing 747-400 aircraft (Registration G-VROS) was renamed from English Rose to Forever  Young in honour of lost colleagues.

The current livery dates from 2010 and returns to the "Eurowhite" design featuring purple billboard titles on the fuselage, slight changes to the Scarlet Lady, and new red metallic paint for the aircraft's tail and engines. On aircraft that have winglets, the wingtips are red, with the logo on the inside facing passengers on board. The Virgin Atlantic logo was also added in purple billboard titles to the underside of the aircraft.

In anticipation of the Airbus A350-1000's introduction to the airline's fleet, Virgin Atlantic announced in April 2019 that its Flying Lady mascot to be adorned on the A350's nose would be replaced by illustrations referred to as Flying Icons, consisting of a range of five individual characters in an effort to represent modern Britain. Each of the characters, separately named Daley, Meera, Oscar, Ray, and Zadie, were styled and posed with Union flags similarly to the Flying Lady. Originally portraying the characters in leotards, the illustrations were later revised by designer Toby Tinsley to instead portray the characters wearing more clothing and revealing less skin, prior to their application on Virgin Atlantic's first A350. Meera, one of the first five characters, was also at some point changed to or replaced by Mei, a new character portraying a Chinese woman. Reasons for the changes or revisions were not provided by Virgin Atlantic or anyone involved in the branding. At least one additional Flying Icon was unveiled to complement the initial five, including an icon portraying an Indian woman, named Aria.

Incidents and accidents
Virgin Atlantic is considered to have a strong safety reputation. Since the airline's founding in 1984, it has never suffered a complete hull-loss incident or a passenger fatality.

 On 5 November 1997, after numerous attempts to shake free the jammed main landing gear of an Airbus A340-300 (G-VSKY) failed, the aircraft en route from Los Angeles to Heathrow made an emergency landing at Heathrow Airport. The aircraft sustained major damage to the undersides of engines one, two, and four, which made contact with the runway surface during landing. The runway surface was also damaged and several runway lights were broken as the right main landing gear wheels broke up during the deceleration. The aircraft was evacuated safely. Two crew members and five passengers sustained minor injuries during the evacuation. The damaged aircraft was repaired after the incident and was retired from the Virgin Atlantic fleet in 2003.
 On 8 February 2005, on board an Airbus A340-600 aircraft (G-VATL) en route from Hong Kong to Heathrow, the fuel control computer system caused a loss of automatic fuel transfer between tanks. The pilots diverted to Amsterdam and landed safely. The interim accident report made four safety recommendations addressed to the primary certification bodies for large transport category aircraft (EASA and the FAA), advising on the need for a low-fuel warning system for large aircraft.
 On 11 August 2011, Virgin Atlantic flight VS52, a Boeing 747-400 (G-VXLG) operating from Tobago-A.N.R. Robinson International Airport to London Gatwick Airport sustained minor damage in a taxiing incident. The airplane was taxiing out towards the departure runway at Tobago-A.N.R. Robinson International Airport when it entered a taxiway that was closed for construction activity. One of the wheels partly sank through the concrete. This resulted in the Boeing 747-400 becoming stuck.
 On 29 December 2014, a Boeing 747-400 (G-VROM) operating a flight from London Gatwick Airport to McCarran International Airport (now Harry Reid International Airport) in Las Vegas, Nevada as Virgin Atlantic flight 43, returned back to Gatwick following an indication that the far right main landing gear was stuck inside the aircraft. The Boeing 747-400 landed safely on runway 26L at Gatwick without further incident. Investigators found that an actuator in the landing gear was installed inverted, sticking the landing gear leg sideways and could not be extended. There were no injuries to the 445 people on board and the aircraft returned to service on 11 January 2015.
 On 15 March 2021, Virgin Atlantic flight 453 operated by a Boeing 787-9 en route to Tel Aviv from Heathrow was forced to return to Heathrow after the aircraft was subject to a laser attack from the ground during take-off. The flight crew issued an emergency Pan call whilst flying over Paris  after the captain lost sight in one eye. No other injuries were reported.
 On 2 May 2022, Virgin Atlantic flight VS3, callsign VIR3N operated by an Airbus A330-343 (G-VWAG) was bound for New York’s John F. Kennedy Airport from London Heathrow Airport when it was forced to turn around over Ireland approximately 35 minutes after takeoff. This was due to a rostering error leading to the First Officer operating the flight before they had fully completed their company training. The CAA confirmed that the First Officer in question is a fully qualified pilot and no risk to safety or wrongdoing took place. Virgin confirmed it was an internal training incident and swiftly replaced the First Officer to allow the flight to resume shortly after.

See also

 Air transport in the United Kingdom
 List of airlines in the United Kingdom
 Transport in the United Kingdom

References

Citations

Bibliography
 Gregory, Martyn. Dirty Tricks: British Airways' Secret War Against Virgin Atlantic. New York: Virgin, 2000. 
 Bower, Tom. Branson. UK: Fourth Estate, 2001 
 Branson, Richard. Losing my Virginity – The Autobiography. London: Virgin Books Ltd, 2006 [2nd reprint]

External links

 
Airlines of the United Kingdom
Companies that filed for Chapter 11 bankruptcy in 2020
Association of European Airlines members
British Air Transport Association
Price fixing convictions
Companies based in Crawley
Airlines established in 1984
British companies established in 1984
1984 establishments in England
Privately held companies of England
British brands